Sean Daniels (born November 13, 1991) is an American football defensive end who is currently a free agent. He played college football at Temple University.

Early life
Daniels attended Highland Regional High School.

College career
Daniels played for the Temple Owls from 2010 to 2013. He was the team's starter his final year and helped the Owls to 23 wins. He played in 30 games during his career, including one start at outside linebacker and three starts at defensive end.

Statistics
Source:

Professional career

Harrisburg Stampede
Daniels signed with the Harrisburg Stampede of the Professional Indoor Football League on September 10, 2014. The team folded in December 2014.

Iowa Barnstormers
Daniels signed with the Iowa Barnstormers for the 2015 season. He led the team with 6.0 sacks and was 6th on the team with 40.0 tackles.

Hamilton Tiger-Cats
On June 10, 2015, Daniels signed with the Hamilton Tiger-Cats. He was released just 9 days later.

Green Bay Blizzard

On March 30, 2016, Daniels signed with the Green Bay Blizzard. He was released on April 13, 2016. Daniels appeared in one game with the Blizzard and record 1 tackle.

Philadelphia Soul
Daniels was assigned to the Philadelphia Soul on May 10, 2016. On August 26, 2016, the Soul beat the Arizona Rattlers in ArenaBowl XXIX by a score of 56–42. On January 5, 2017, the Soul exercised their rookie option on Daniels. Daniels won Defensive Player of the Week during Week 6 of the 2017 season when he recorded 3 tackles and returned a fumble for the game-winning touchdown with 33 seconds left in the game. He was named First Team All-Arena in 2017. On August 26, 2017, the Soul beat the Tampa Bay Storm in ArenaBowl XXX by a score of 44–40.

Return to Green Bay Blizzard
In February 2018, Daniels signed with the Green Bay Blizzard.

Philadelphia Soul
Daniels was assigned to the Philadelphia Soul on March 20, 2018. On April 3, 2019, Daniels was again assigned to the Soul.

AFL statistics

Stats from ArenaFan:

Personal life
Daniels is the younger brother of Mike Daniels.

References

External links
 Temple Owls bio

1991 births
Living people
Players of American football from Camden, New Jersey
American football defensive linemen
Canadian football defensive linemen
American players of Canadian football
Temple Owls football players
Harrisburg Stampede players
Iowa Barnstormers players
Hamilton Tiger-Cats players
Green Bay Blizzard players
Philadelphia Soul players
Sportspeople from Camden, New Jersey